Ioannis Chatzinikolas (alternate spelling: Giannis) (born 7 October 1995) is a Greek professional basketball player for Kolossos Rodou of the Greek Basket League. He can play at both the point guard and shooting guard positions.

Professional career
After playing youth basketball with the junior teams of Nea Kifissia, Chatzinikolas began his professional career in 2011, with the Greek Second Division club Nea Kifissia's senior men's team. In 2014, he was loaned to Pagrati. He left Nea Kifissia, when the club was relegated down from the first-tier level Greek Basket League, to the third-tier level Greek B League, due to financial problems.

On August 3, 2016, he joined Koroivos Amaliadas. On September 10, 2019, Chatzinikolas returned to the first division, signing with PAOK Thessaloniki.

On July 27, 2020, he transferred to the newly promoted team of Charilaos Trikoupis.

National team career
With the junior national teams of Greece, Chatzinikolas played at the 2013 FIBA Europe Under-18 Championship, and the 2015 FIBA Europe Under-20 Championship.

References

External links 
 Ioannis Chatzinikolas at fiba.com (archive)
 Ioannis Chatzinikolas at fibaeurope.com
 Ioannis Chatzinikolas at eurobasket.com
 Ioannis Chatzinikolas at esake.gr 

1995 births
Living people
Aries Trikala B.C. players
Charilaos Trikoupis B.C. players
Greek Basket League players
Greek expatriate basketball people in Germany
Koroivos B.C. players
Kolossos Rodou B.C. players
Nea Kifissia B.C. players
Pagrati B.C. players
P.A.O.K. BC players
Shooting guards
Point guards
Basketball players from Athens